Olu Babalola (born 10 September 1981) is a British professional basketball player who plays for the Leeds Force in the British Basketball League.

Born in London, England, Babalola played for St. Augustine Preparatory School in Richland, New Jersey, where he won a state championship in his sophomore season.  He went on to team with Pops Mensah Bonsu during his senior season in high school.

The 6 ft 6 in power forward attended Clemson University before signing for Italian basketball team Roseto Basket in 2005 and soon after moving to Jämtland Basket in the Swedish Obol Basketball League. Early in 2006 Babalola returned to his homeland to sign for British Basketball League team Newcastle Eagles, making his debut against the Guildford Heat on 3 February 2006. Three months later Babalola won the "clean sweep" of trophies with the Eagles. He also represented the British University national team in 2005.

References

1981 births
Living people
British expatriate basketball people
British expatriate basketball people in the United States
British expatriates in Italy
English expatriate sportspeople in Sweden
Black British sportspeople
Clemson Tigers men's basketball players
English men's basketball players
English people of Yoruba descent
Jämtland Basket players
Newcastle Eagles players
Sheffield Sharks players
Basketball players from Greater London
St. Augustine Preparatory School alumni
Power forwards (basketball)
Yoruba sportspeople